Romanus Adolf Hedwig (1772 – 1806), sometimes styled as Romano Adolpho Hedwigio or simply R.A.H., was a German botanist best known for his studies into pteridophytes, spermatophytes, mycology, and bryology. He is the son of notable bryologist Johann Hedwig. 

Romanus worked closely with his father, illustrating the publication Filicum genera et species recentiori methodo accomodatae analytice descriptae in 1799. Following in his late father's footsteps, he was appointed as the Professor of Botany at the University of Leipzig in 1801. Romanus became good friends with Augustin Pyramus de Candolle, and the two would often send correspondences and exchange specimens. Romanus was personally thanked for his contributions in de Candolle's publication  Upon the death of Romanus in 1806, his personal herbarium was sold with some material being incorporated into his father's collection.

Published works

References

1772 births
1806 deaths
18th-century German botanists
Bryologists
Academic staff of Leipzig University